St. Agnes Cathedral is a Roman Catholic Cathedral in Rockville Centre, New York, on Long Island. It is the seat of the Diocese of Rockville Centre. The Most Reverend John Oliver Barres is the ordinary bishop of the Diocese and pastor of the Cathedral parish. The Saint Agnes Cathedral School is on campus with the Cathedral.

History

The Parish of St. Agnes was founded in 1887, when the first Mass was celebrated at Walter Johnson's blacksmith shop with an anvil as the altar. By 1890, the blacksmith shop could no longer accommodate the parishioners so a small group rented the Gildersleeve's Hall in the local Institute Building. Next, a former school building was used as a church. St. Agnes Parish was formerly established by Bishop Charles Edward McDonnell of Brooklyn, in 1894. In 1905, a white marble stone Church was built, to serve the Catholic population of Rockville Centre. Due to the increasing number of parishioners, the small marble church grew insufficient for the needs of the parish, so demolition began in 1933, under the direction of Msgr. Peter Quealy.

In 1935 the current building was completed and in 1957, Pope Pius XII announced the formation of the Diocese of Rockville Centre and appointed Most Rev. Walter P. Kellenberg to be its bishop. 1981 saw a major facelift for the aging building and while the Cathedral was being renovated, daily Mass was celebrated in the Episcopal Church of the Ascension located across the street. In 1986, Mother Teresa visited the Cathedral and spoke at a prayer service.

Completed in 2004, the St Agnes Parish Center celebrated its grand opening. It has served for parish activities ever since. In 2007, the Cathedral participated in a year-long celebration for the 50th Anniversary of the Diocese of Rockville Centre. St. Agnes Cathedral School, located on the Cathedral parish property, was founded in 1917, and was instrumental in the growth of the parish. It is currently under the leadership of  Mrs. Cecilia St. John, Principal and Mr. Brian Jensen, Assistant Principal.

In May 2007, Msgr. Robert Guglielmone was named the Rector, replacing Msgr. James Kelly. He was formally installed on September 23, 2007. Guglielmone was subsequently named bishop of the Diocese of Charleston, South Carolina and was ordained and installed on March 25, 2009. Bishop Guglielmone was succeeded by Msgr. William Koenig, who served as an Associate Pastor 10 years prior. In June 2010, Msgr. Robert Brennan was assigned to Long Beach, New York as pastor of Our Lady of the Isle Parish. He served as an associate pastor at St. Agnes for 16 years. Msgr. Brennan will continue to be the Vicar General for the Diocese of Rockville Centre.

In August of 2020, Bishop John O. Barres appointed the Rev. Michael F. Duffy as the new Rector of St. Agnes Cathedral. At 35, he is the youngest rector in the history of St. Agnes Cathedral.

Organ and music
For 19 years, St. Agnes Cathedral did not have a major pipe organ in the cathedral proper. The original pipe organ from the 1930s was built by the Wurlitzer Company and remained in use until 1972. The rector of that time (Monsignor Edward Melton) was concerned with maintaining the parish schools so an electronic organ was temporarily installed. A small Moeller pipe organ was located in the 1960s and 70s near the Blessed Sacrament Chapel and later moved to the Lower Church. The previous church building of 1905 contained a Midmer pipe organ which was enlarged by a Rockville Centre pipe organ builder when a larger rear gallery was built in the "Marble Church." To mark the Jubilee Year of 2000 plans were made to build a new pipe organ for St. Agnes Cathedral Parish. The organ is located in 3 locations in the cathedral to serve the congregation, choirs, and other ministers. In 2001, The Wicks Organ Company of Highland, Illinois, installed the organ. St. Agnes Cathedral has three choirs:

The Cathedral Choir of Men and Boys (founded in 1957), the Junior and Senior Divisions of the Cathedral Girls Choir, and the Cathedral Chorale and Schola Cantorum. The choirs are directed by Mr. Michael L. Bower. 

On May 1, 2019, St. Michael's Choir School visited St. Agnes Cathedral as part of their 2019 New York Tour. They collaborated with the Cathedral and Diocesan Choirs of the Diocese of Rockville Centre as part of the concert.

Cathedral Clergy
Bishop
Most Reverend John Oliver Barres D.D., S.T.D., J.C.L., Bishop of Rockville Centre
Parish Clergy
Very Rev. Michael F. Duffy, Rector
Rev. Alessandro da Luz, Associate Pastor
Rev. German Villabon, O.S.A., Associate Pastor
Rev. Rev. Bright Appiagyei-Boakye, Associate Pastor
In Residence
Most Rev. William F. Murphy, D.D., S.T.D. Diocesan Bishop Emeritus
Rev. Msgr. James Vlaun
Rev. John J. McCartney, Chancellor

See also
List of Catholic cathedrals in the United States

References

External links
Official Cathedral Site
Roman Catholic Diocese of Rockville Centre Official Site

Religious organizations established in 1887
Roman Catholic churches completed in 1935
Agnes
Roman Catholic churches in New York (state)
Rockville Centre, New York
Churches in Nassau County, New York
Roman Catholic Diocese of Rockville Centre
Gothic Revival church buildings in New York (state)
20th-century Roman Catholic church buildings in the United States